Joel Natangwe Kaapanda (born 12 June 1945) is a Namibian politician. A member of the South West Africa People's Organization (SWAPO), Kaapanda was a member of the National Assembly of Namibia from November 2002 to March 2020. He served in cabinet as Minister of Regional and Local Government, Housing and Rural Development from 2002 to 2005, as Minister of Public Works, Transport and Communication from 2005 to 2008, and as Minister of Information and Communication Technology from 2008 to March 2015. Previously he was Namibia's first High Commissioner to India from 1995 to 2002.

Career
In the 1970s, Kaapanda began his career as a primary school teacher at Nambula Combined School, Omusati Region before joining SWAPO in exile as a political officer in the People's Liberation Army of Namibia from 1978 to 1981. From 1981 to 1986, Kaapanda was the leader of SWAPO students in Hamburg, Germany.

On Heroes' Day 2014 he was conferred the Most Brilliant Order of the Sun, Second Class.

References

1945 births
Living people
Namibian military personnel
Members of the National Assembly (Namibia)
People from Omusati Region
High Commissioners of Namibia to India
SWAPO politicians
Urban and rural development ministers of Namibia
Works and transport ministers of Namibia
Information ministers of Namibia